Churkin (from Чурка, a pejorative term for an unintelligent person) is a Russian masculine surname, its feminine counterpart is Churkina. It may refer to
Aleksei Churkin (born 1998), Russian Paralympic athlete
Anzhelika Churkina (born 1969), Ukrainian Paralympic sitting volleyball player
Denis Churkin (footballer, born 1979), Russian football player
Denis Churkin (footballer, born 2001), Russian football player
Olga Churkina, Russian Paralympic pentathlete 
Vitaly Churkin (1952–2017), Russian diplomat
Vladimir Churkin (1953–2021), Russian football player and coach.

References

Russian-language surnames